Alexander Murdoch Mackay (13 October 1849 – 4 February 1890) was a Scottish Presbyterian missionary to Uganda known as Mackay of Uganda.

Life
Mackay was born on 13 October 1849 in Rhynie, Aberdeenshire, the son of Rev Alexander Mackay LLD (1813-1895) and his first wife, Margaret Lillie (1825-1865).

He studied at the Free Church Training School for Teachers at Edinburgh, then at the University of Edinburgh, and finally in Berlin. He displayed a great aptitude for mechanics, and spent several years as a draughtsman in Germany.

Mackay decided to become a missionary after Henry Morton Stanley was told by Mutesa I of Buganda that Uganda wanted missionaries. He joined the Church Missionary Society in 1876. Mackay reached Zanzibar on 30 March 1876, followed by Uganda in November 1878.

He taught various skills to the Ugandan people, including carpentry and farming. He was named Muzungu wa Kazi  by the Ugandans. The name means "white man of work." Mackay's work in Uganda came under threat after Kiwewa came into power. He worked in Uganda until 1890. He became sick with malarial fever and died four days later on 4 February 1890 aged only 40.

See also
 Mackay Memorial College

Bibliography
 Alexander M. Mackay, Pioneer Missionary of the Church Missionary Society in Uganda; by his Sister. London, 1899.
 A. E. Macdonald (pseud. of Andrew Melrose). Alexander Mackay, Missionary Hero of Uganda. London, 1893.
 Mackay of Uganda. The story of the life of Mackay of Uganda by his sister. Hodder & Stoughton, London, 1906. 323 pages.
 Fahs, Sophia Lyon. Uganda's White Man of Work: A Story of Alexander M. Mackay. New York: Young People's Missionary Movement (1907).
  "The Greatest Missionary since Livingstone", an Address by Professor Anthony Low, at St John the Baptist's Parish Church, Canberra, ACT, 15 October 2000.

Notes

References

External links
Alexander Mackay biographies

Scottish Presbyterian missionaries
Presbyterian missionaries in Uganda
Scottish evangelicals
1849 births
1890 deaths